Mary Marjorie (née Mull) Pebworth (August 19, 1910 – April 3, 1967) was an American politician.

Born in Homer, Indiana, Pebworth received her bachelor's degree from Indiana University in 1932 and then worked at the Indiana General Assembly Legislative Reference Bureau. In 1949, Pebworth and her husband Robert moved to Illinois. Pebworth served on the high school and junior college boards and was a Republican. She lived in Riverdale, Illinois.

From 1965 until her death in 1967, Pebworth served in the Illinois House of Representatives. Pebworth died at her home in Riverdale, Illinois.

Notes

1910 births
1967 deaths
Politicians from Cook County, Illinois
People from Rush County, Indiana
Indiana University alumni
School board members in Illinois
Women state legislators in Illinois
Republican Party members of the Illinois House of Representatives
20th-century American politicians
20th-century American women politicians
People from Riverdale, Illinois